, also umusa or umsa, was an Ainu greeting ritual that, like the related , became a ceremonial—of trade—full of the political symbolism of subservience, to the Matsumae Domain.

Name

Related images

See also

 Invented tradition

References

Ainu culture
History of Hokkaido